Eduard Jacob Neven Looijenga (born 30 September 1948, Zaandam) is a Dutch mathematician who works in algebraic geometry and the theory of algebraic groups. He was a professor of mathematics at Utrecht University until his retirement in 2013.

Looijenga studied mathematics at the University of Amsterdam beginning in 1965, and earned a master's degree there in 1971. He obtained a Dutch fellowship for two years of study at the Institut des Hautes Études Scientifiques in France, and then returned to the University of Amsterdam, earning a Ph.D. in 1974 under the supervision of Nicolaas Kuiper. After postdoctoral research at the University of Liverpool, he took a faculty position at the University of Nijmegen in 1975, returned as a professor to the University of Amsterdam in 1987, and moved again to Utrecht in 1991. Since his 2013 retirement, he has also held a professorship at Tsinghua University.

In 1978, Looijenga was an invited speaker at the International Congress of Mathematicians. He became a member of the Royal Netherlands Academy of Arts and Sciences in 1995, and in 2012 he became one of the inaugural fellows of the American Mathematical Society. In 2013, a conference in honor of his retirement was held at Utrecht University.

Publications

References

External links
Home page

1948 births
Living people
20th-century Dutch mathematicians
21st-century Dutch mathematicians
University of Amsterdam alumni
Academic staff of Radboud University Nijmegen
Academic staff of Utrecht University
Academic staff of the University of Amsterdam
Academic staff of Tsinghua University
Fellows of the American Mathematical Society
Members of the Royal Netherlands Academy of Arts and Sciences
People from Zaanstad
Topologists
Algebraic geometers